Musotima nitidalis, also known as the golden brown fern moth, is a species of moth of the family Crambidae. This species was described by Francis Walker in 1866. It is native to Australia and New Zealand and was first found in Europe in 2009.

Description
The larvae of this species are pale green with a transparent skin and a dark head. Adults are brown with various white markings outlined in black on each forewing.

Hosts 
The larvae feed on the undersides of the leaves of various Polypodiophyta species, including Adiantum aethiopicum, Pteridium esculentum, and Histiopteris incisa, and lives in a sparse web. Pupation takes place in a folded leaf of the food plant, held by strands of white silk.

Distribution
It is known from New Zealand and most of Australia, including Queensland, Tasmania, Victoria, South Australia and Western Australia. In 2009 the moth was found in Dorset, England and since then has been found across southern England between Dorset and Essex. Larvae have been found in England and it is suspected to have been introduced from imported tree ferns.

References

Musotiminae
Moths described in 1866
Moths of Australia
Moths of Europe
Moths of New Zealand
Taxa named by Francis Walker (entomologist)